Hevea camporum is a species of flowering plant in the genus Hevea, the rubber trees, belonging to the family Euphorbiaceae. It is native to the Amazon basin where it occurs in Amazonas State in northwestern Brazil. Its habitat is dry savannah.

References

Trees of the Amazon
Trees of Brazil
Crotonoideae
Taxa named by Adolpho Ducke